The murder of Kujoe Bonsafo Agyei-Kodie, an exchange student from Ghana, is alleged to have been carried out by Alexander Kinyua (born October 23, 1990 in Nairobi) in Joppatowne, Maryland, United States. Kinyua is alleged to have eaten Agyei-Kodie's organs in an act of cannibalism.
The killing came after Kinyua was released on bail following a separate brutal attack.

Background
Kinyua emigrated from Kenya to the United States as a child and became a U.S. citizen. At the time of the alleged murder and cannibalism, 21-year-old Kinyua was an engineering student at Morgan State University, a university in nearby Baltimore. His father is a professor at the school.

Kinyua had posted nonsensical and bizarre writings on his Facebook page. For example, two days before Kinyua's arrest, he wrote:

HEAR ME OUT BUTCHERS: ARE YOU STRONG ENOUGH TO ENDURE RITUAL HBCU MASS HUMAN SACRIFICES AROUND THE COUNTRY AND STILL BE ABLE TO FUNCTION AS HUMAN BEINGS? IT'S BEEN ALL TOO TRAGIC WITH THE DUAL UNIVERSITY SHOOTINGS AT VIRGINIA TECH, AND OTHER PAST UNIVERSITY KILLINGS ACROSS THE COUNTRY. NOW FOR A TWIST: ETHNIC CLEANSING IS THE POLICY, STRATEGY AND TACTICS THAT WILL AFFECT YOU, DIRECTLY OR INDIRECTLY IN THE COMING MONTHS. THIS IS THE BRUTAL BASIS, AN EVIL & TERRIFYING METHOD OF THIS DEATH CULTS.

Kinyua's mother posted on her Facebook: 

Our son, Alexander Kimanthi Kinyua, was arrested on Saturday, May 19, for being involved in a fight in his dormitory room at Morgan State University. The charge against him is "1st Degree Assault and Excessive Endangerment of Life". His bail has been set for US $220,000.00. In order to get him the best defense possible, we need to secure an attorney who will take his case and leave no stone unturned.

Murder
Agyei-Kodie was staying with the Kinyua family pending deportation to his home country due to non-compliance with the terms of his visa.  He had first met Antony Kinyua, the father of his alleged killer, while pursuing a doctoral degree at Morgan State University. On Friday, May 25, 2012, Kujoe Bonsafo Agyei-Kodie was reported missing by Kinyua's father.  Police reported to the Kinyua residence on May 31 after being contacted by Kinyua's brother to report what looked like body parts in two tins in the basement.  Further remains were found outside a church about a mile away. Alexander Kinyua was arrested and charged with first degree murder, along with first and second degree assault.

Aftermath
Morgan State established a chief public safety officer position in the wake of the killing.

Kinyua was diagnosed with paranoid schizophrenia and was found incompetent to stand trial.

Kinyua has been indefinitely committed to a Maryland mental institution.

See also 
Internet homicide

References

2012 murders in the United States
Incidents of cannibalism
Murder trials
People murdered in Maryland
2012 in Maryland
May 2012 crimes in the United States